Geostari (Georgian: ჯეოსტარი) is the Georgian franchise of the Idol series, which airs on Rustavi 2.  Georgia is the fifth former Soviet country to have acquired an Idol franchise after Armenia, Estonia, Kazakhstan, and Russia.

GEOStar is also the name of a satellite communications system that operated in the 1980s.

History
The series began on 2006 as an Idol spin-off, but it is only in its third season in 2008 that it has enable to acquire a license from FremantleMedia, owner of the Idol franchise which resulted in a change of the rules following the same format as other Idol shows were only the viewers decide upon the verdict of the contestants. Former seasons have seen the judges saving one of the bottom two contestants with their Power of Veto at the end of each episode.

The sixth season started in October 2010 and ended December 31, 2011. After six seasons known as Geostari, the program was to be redeveloped in 2012 by Rustavi 2 to the new title of საქართველოს ვარსკვლავი or Sakartvelos Varskvlavi (Georgian Idol) was to premiere in September however was delayed to the 2012 Georgian protests. The program eventually returned in 2019 and was used to select the Georgian representative for the Eurovision Song Contest.

Contestants
Giorgi Sukhitashvili won the third season making him the first male contestant to win the show following the two women Tiko Chulukhadze and Ani Kekua. It is therefore also the first former Soviet country which saw victory for both genders in its Idol adaptation whereas Narodniy Artist (Russia) and  SuperStar KZ (Kazakhstan) only had male winners and Hay Superstar (Armenia) and Eesti otsib superstaari (Estonia) only had females.

Hosts and Judges

Season 4
Hosts
Duta Skhirtladze
Anano Mjhavia

Judges
Marina Beridze
Levan Tsuladze
Buba Kikabidze

Bottom three Statistics

Season 3

Elimination chart

Season 3

Season 4

Season 5

Levan Kbilashvili quit the show after a car accident. Therefore, Indira Gerenaia, who was voted off the last in the competition, was brought back as the replacement. The producers decided to give a second chance to Levan in the next season
Ani Siradze quit the show by her own decision. Therefore, Natia Dumadze, who was voted off the last in the competition, was brought back as the replacement.

Season 6

References

External links
 Season 1 Official website
 Season 2 Official website
 Season 3 Official website
 Season 4 Official website
 Season 5 Official website

Idols (franchise)
2006 Georgia (country) television series debuts
Television series by Fremantle (company)
Non-British television series based on British television series
2010s Georgia (country) television series
Rustavi 2 original programming
Georgia (country) in the Eurovision Song Contest
Eurovision Song Contest selection events